The 2019 Asian Artistic Gymnastics Championships was the eighth edition of the Asian Artistic Gymnastics Championships, and were held in Ulaanbaatar, Mongolia from 19 to 22 June 2019.

Medal summary

Men

Women

Medal table

References 

Asian Artistic Gymnastics Championships
Asian Gymnastics Championships
International gymnastics competitions hosted by Mongolia
2019 in Mongolian sport
Asian Artistic Gymnastics Championships